Janez Petač (6 March 1949 – 23 May 2011) was a former Yugoslav ice hockey player. He played for the Yugoslavia men's national ice hockey team at the 1976 Winter Olympics in Innsbruck.

References

1949 births
2011 deaths
Ice hockey players at the 1976 Winter Olympics
Olympic ice hockey players of Yugoslavia
Slovenian ice hockey right wingers
Sportspeople from Ljubljana
Yugoslav ice hockey right wingers
Slovenian ice hockey coaches
Yugoslav ice hockey coaches
HDD Olimpija Ljubljana players